Valea Pietrei may refer to the following places in Romania: 

 Valea Pietrei, a village in the commune Urlați, Prahova County
 Valea Pietrei, a tributary of the Lotru in Vâlcea County
 Valea Pietrei (Râul Mare), a river in Hunedoara County
 Valea Pietrei, a tributary of the Vărbilău in Prahova County
 Valea Pietrei Mari, a tributary of the Timiș in Brașov County